Emil Johansson may refer to:
 Emil Johansson (footballer) (born 1986), Swedish footballer
 Emil Johansson (tug of war) (1885–1972), Swedish tug of war competitor
 Emil Johansson (boxer) (1907–1986), Swedish boxer
 Emil Johansson (ice hockey) (born 1996), Swedish ice hockey player